Barbara Bagócsi (born 18 May 1988 in Budapest) is a retired Hungarian handball player.

References

External links
 Player Profile on Handball.hu
 Barbara Bagócsi career statistics at Worldhandball

1988 births
Living people
Hungarian female handball players
Handball players from Budapest
Expatriate handball players
Hungarian expatriate sportspeople in Italy
Hungarian expatriate sportspeople in Germany